RM Johnson  is an American writer, the author of nine adult urban fiction novels and one young adult fiction novel. He is best known for stories dealing with love, sex and the various challenges faced by African Americans. Johnson's works have appeared on the Essence magazine's bestselling books list.

Works written by Johnson include The Harris Men, The Million Dollar Divorce, Love Frustration and The Million Dollar Demise. His first non-fiction work, Why Men Fear Marriage, was published on July 28, 2009. In 2011, he released a collaborative work with the late E. Lynn Harris, No One in the World.

Works

Fiction
The Harris Men
Father Found
The Harris Family
Dating Games
Love Frustration
The Million Dollar Divorce
Do You Take This Woman?
The Million Dollar Deception
The Million Dollar Demise
No One in the World (with E. Lynn Harris)
Deceit and Devotion
Bishop
Bishop 2
Bishop 3: Fall From Grace
Keeping Secrets
Keeping the Secret 2
Keeping the Secret 3
My Wife's Baby: I Am Not A Murderer

Non-fiction
Why Men Fear Marriage? The Surprising Truth Behind Why So Many Men Can't Commit

Young adult fiction
Stacie & Cole

References

Living people
Year of birth missing (living people)
20th-century American novelists
21st-century American novelists
American male novelists
20th-century American male writers
21st-century American male writers